Anush Manukyan (born February 7, 1970) is an Armenian retired swimmer. She competed at the 1996 Summer Olympics in the women's 100 metre breaststroke. She was the first woman to represent Armenia at the Olympics.

References

External links
Sports-Reference.com

1970 births
Living people
Sportspeople from Yerevan
Armenian female breaststroke swimmers
Olympic swimmers of Armenia
Swimmers at the 1996 Summer Olympics